Tanner Smith (born 8 March 1994) is a former professional Australian rules footballer who played for the Fremantle Football Club in the Australian Football League (AFL). He mainly played as a key position defender.

Early life
Originally from Horsham, Victoria, Smith attended St Patrick's College in Ballarat and played for the North Ballarat Rebels in the TAC Cup.  He represented Victorian Country at the 2012 AFL Under 18 Championships. Nominated as the 36th selection at the 2012 national draft as a key position defender, Smith started the 2013 season  at Peel Thunder in the West Australian Football League (WAFL).

AFL career
Smith made his AFL debut in round 4, 2013 against  at Aurora Stadium in Tasmania, as a late replacement for Luke McPharlin, who failed the concussion test.

Smith was delisted at the conclusion of the 2016 season.

Smith joined North Adelaide Football Club in the SANFL at the start of the 2017 football season. Initially recruited as a forward he soon became an integral part of the teams backline, and was Centre Half Back in the teams drought breaking 2018 Premiership team.

Statistics

|-
|- style="background-color: #EAEAEA"
! scope="row" style="text-align:center" | 2013
|
| 22 || 1 || 0 || 0 || 4 || 4 || 8 || 4 || 2 || 0.0 || 0.0 || 4.0 || 4.0 || 8.0 || 4.0 || 2.0
|- 
! scope="row" style="text-align:center" | 2015
|
| 22 || 1 || 0 || 0 || 11 || 6 || 17 || 8 || 2 || 0.0 || 0.0 || 11.0 || 6.0 || 17.0 || 8.0 || 2.0
|- style="background-color: #EAEAEA"
! scope="row" style="text-align:center" | 2016
|
| 22 || 2 || 2 || 0 || 9 || 9 || 18 || 4 || 5 || 1.0 || 0.0 || 4.5 || 4.5 || 9.0 || 2.0 || 2.5
|- class="sortbottom"
! colspan=3| Career
! 4
! 2
! 0
! 24
! 19
! 43
! 16
! 9
! 0.5
! 0.0
! 6.0
! 4.8
! 10.8
! 4.0
! 2.2
|}

References

External links

1994 births
Living people
Fremantle Football Club players
Peel Thunder Football Club players
Australian rules footballers from Victoria (Australia)
Greater Western Victoria Rebels players
North Ballarat Football Club players

North Adelaide Football Club players